Aloe humilis, also known as spider aloe is a species of succulent plant  in the genus Aloe. It is endemic to South Africa's Cape Province, and is a low growing, short stemmed aloe with small spines and which grows in dense clusters.

References

External links
Aloe humilis forum

Flora of South Africa
humilis
Critically endangered plants
Endemic flora of South Africa
Taxa named by Philip Miller